Turned On is a live album from the Rollins Band, fronted by ex-Black Flag singer, Henry Rollins, recorded in Vienna, Austria on November 27, 1989. Even though the album sleeve has the individual tracks listed, the CD is entirely contained in one track.

Track listing
"Lonely" - 4:59
"Do It" (Pink Fairies cover) - 2:55
"What Have I Got" - 5:42
"Tearing" - 5:08
"Out There" - 11:37
"You Didn't Need" - 5:26
"Hard" - 4:20
"Followed Around" - 2:46
"Mask" - 1:38
"Down and Away" - 5:47
"Turned Inside Out" - 6:57
"The Dietmar Song" - 2:28
"Black and White" - 3:31
"What Do You Do?" - 6:29
"Crazy Lover" (Richard Berry) - 4:44

Personnel
Rollins Band
Henry Rollins - vocals
Chris Haskett - guitar
Andrew Weiss - bass guitar
Sim Cain - drums

References

External links
Discogs Page
Rollins Band official home page

Rollins Band albums
1990 live albums
Quarterstick Records live albums